Badir is an Arabic given name and surname. Notable people with the name include:

Given name
 Badir Shoukri (born 1926), Egyptian sports shooter

Surname
 Walid Badir (born 1974), Israeli football player
 Youhannes Ezzat Zakaria Badir (1949–2015), Egyptian bishop

Arabic-language surnames
Arabic masculine given names